The Music Lovers were a San Francisco-based pop-group.

History
The band was formed in San Francisco in 2003 by English singer-songwriter Matthew Edwards. 
Between 2003 and 2009 the group released three album and one EP on Le Grand Magistery Records of Detroit.
Matthew dissolved the group in 2010. Subsequently Matthew reappeared with Matthew Edwards and the Unfortunates, whose debut album The Fates was released in 2012..

Discography
 2003 – ‘Cheap Songs Tell the Truth’ (EP) - Le Grand Magistery/Marriage Records
 2004 – ‘The Words We Say Before We Sleep’ - Le Grand Magistery/Marriage Records
 2006 – ‘The Music Lovers Guide for Young People’ – Le Grand Magistery Records (US) Enougho (JA)
 2009 - 'Masculine Feminine' - Le Grand Magistery Records (US) Sleeping Star (IT)

American pop music groups
Musical groups from San Francisco
Musical groups established in 2003